The Association of Independent Technological Universities (AITU) is a group of private American engineering colleges established in 1957. The purpose of the association is to share ideas and practices that promote innovation and entrepreneurship, promote technology-oriented careers and advance post-secondary education in engineering and science.

Member institutions
The Association of Independent Technological Universities was founded by fifteen colleges. Since then, two of the original institutions have left the association (after having expanded from their original scope as technological universities) and many of the remaining thirteen have undergone name changes and/or mergers. In addition, nine more colleges have joined the association for a total of twenty-two current members.

Original members
California Institute of Technology
Carnegie Institute of Technology
Case Institute of Technology
Clarkson College of Technology
Cooper Union
Drexel Institute
Illinois Institute of Technology
Lehigh University
Massachusetts Institute of Technology
Polytechnic Institute of Brooklyn
Rensselaer Polytechnic Institute
Rice Institute
Rose Polytechnic Institute
Stevens Institute of Technology
Worcester Polytechnic Institute

Current members
California Institute of Technology
Carnegie Mellon University
Case Western Reserve University
Clarkson University
Cooper Union for the Advancement of Science and Art
Embry-Riddle Aeronautical University
Franklin W. Olin College of Engineering
Harvey Mudd College
Illinois Institute of Technology
Keck Graduate Institute of Applied Life Sciences
Kettering University
Lawrence Technological University
Massachusetts Institute of Technology
Milwaukee School of Engineering
New York Institute of Technology
New York University Tandon School of Engineering
Rensselaer Polytechnic Institute
Rochester Institute of Technology
Rose-Hulman Institute of Technology
Stevens Institute of Technology
Webb Institute
Worcester Polytechnic Institute

References

External links
 Official website

College and university associations and consortia in the United States